Leslie King (1876 - October 10, 1947) was an American stage and screen actor. He is best remembered for appearing as Jacques-forget-me-not in D. W. Griffith's Orphans of the Storm opposite Lillian and Dorothy Gish.

Selected filmography
The Shielding Shadow (1916)
Here Comes the Bride (1919)
The Witness for the Defense (1919)
The Fatal Fortune (1919)
The Evil Eye (1920)
Idols of Clay (1920)
Experience (1921)
Orphans of the Storm (1921)
The Bond Boy (1922)
The Streets of New York (1922)
If Winter Comes (1923)
 Broadway Broke (1923)
The New School Teacher (1924)
Alice in Wonderland (1931)
The Horror (1932)

References

External links

Leslie King at IMDb.com
Leslie King at IBDb.com
portraits(NY Public Library, Billy Rose collection)

1876 births
1947 deaths
Male actors from Baltimore
American male silent film actors
20th-century American male actors
American male stage actors